Avatime may refer to:
Avatime people
Avatime language